Live From Ground Zero is Dave Brockie Experience's second album, that was released in the year 2001.  It was recorded live at CBGB's club in New York City on October 3, 2001.  Its title is a reference to the fact that the album was recorded very near Lower Manhattan, under a month after the September 11, 2001 attacks.

Track listing

Tracks 1-10 and 17 written by DBX
Tracks 11, 12 written by Death Piggy
Tracks 14, 15, 16, 18 and 19 written by GWAR
Tracks 21 and 22 written by X-Cops
On track 22, after they finish "You Fucked Up", the band starts playing the Steve Miller Band's "Rock'n Me" before exiting.

Dave Brockie Experience albums
2001 live albums